is a Japanese politician and the current mayor of Hiroshima, the capital city of Hiroshima Prefecture in Japan.

Early life 
Matsui was born on January 8, 1953, in Hiroshima, Japan. His parents are hibakusha, atomic bomb survivors. He earned an undergraduate law degree from Kyoto University.

Career 
In 1976, Matsui began his career by working at the Ministry of Labor in various positions. From 1989 to 1992, he worked at the Japanese embassy in the United Kingdom.  He became mayor in the unified local elections on April 10, 2011. In his bid for the mayoral position, he was supported by the Liberal Democratic Party and New Komeito. He was reelected as Mayor in 2015 and 2019.

Matsui served as the president of an organization called "Mayors for Peace".

References

External links

 Official CV at Mayors for Peace site

Living people
1953 births
Mayors of Hiroshima
Kyoto University alumni